The 2014 AFC U-19 Championship qualification was the qualification round for the 2014 AFC U-19 Championship, which took place in Myanmar. The draw for the qualifiers was held on 26 April 2013 in Kuala Lumpur, Malaysia.

Format
A total of 40 teams entered the qualification tournament and were drawn into nine groups of five or four teams. West Zone, containing teams from West Asia and South/Central Asia, had two groups of five teams and three groups of four teams, while East Zone, containing teams from East Asia and ASEAN, had two groups of five teams and two groups of four teams. The teams were seeded according to their performance in the previous season in 2012. After playing each other once at a centralised venue, the nine group winners and best six runners-up from all groups qualified for the final tournament.

 automatically qualified for the finals as hosts.
The following teams did not enter:

Player eligibility
Players born on or after 1 January 1995 were eligible to compete in the qualification tournament.

Tiebreakers
If two or more teams were equal on points on completion of the group matches, the following criteria were applied to determine the rankings.
 Greater number of points obtained in the group matches between the teams concerned;
 Goal difference resulting from the group matches between the teams concerned;
 Greater number of goals scored in the group matches between the teams concerned;
 Goal difference in all the group matches;
 Greater number of goals scored in all the group matches;
 Kicks from the penalty mark if only two teams are involved and they are both on the field of play;
 Fewer score calculated according to the number of yellow and red cards received in the group matches;
 Drawing of lots.

Groups

Group A
Matches were played in Qatar (UTC+3).

Group B
Matches were played in Jordan (UTC+3).

Group C
Matches were played in Iraq (UTC+3).

Group D
Matches were played in Iran (UTC+3:30).

Group E
Matches were played in Palestine (UTC+3).

Group F
Matches were played in Malaysia (UTC+8).

Group G
Matches were played in Indonesia (UTC+7).

Group H
Matches were played in Thailand (UTC+7).

Group I
Matches were played in China (UTC+8).

Ranking of second-placed teams
In order to ensure equality when comparing the runners-up team of all the groups, the results of the matches between the runner-up team and the bottom-placed team (for Groups D, F, G, H and I, which consist of four teams) or two sides from the bottom (for Groups A and B, which consist of five teams) were considered null and void due to Group C and Group E having only three teams participating in the qualifiers.

The best runner-up teams among those ranked second in the groups were determined as follows:
 Greater number of points obtained from group matches identified by AFC
 Goal difference resulting from group matches identified by AFC
 Greater number of goals scored in group matches identified by AFC
 Fewer number of points calculated according to the number of yellow and red cards received by the team in the group matches identified by AFC
 Drawing of lots.

Qualified teams

 (hosts)

References

External links
AFC U-19 Championship, the-AFC.com

Qualification
2014
U-19 Championship qualification